Anamuah Esme Papa Mends commonly known as Esme Mends (born 22 February 1986) is a Ghanaian football player who plays for Al-Oruba SC in the Oman Professional League.

Personal life
Esme is the son of  Lionel Thompson Mends and Sanatu Mends, both of Rome, Italy and the nephew of Ghana's former permanent representative to the FAO of the UN, Horatio Mends.

Career
Mends began his youth playing career at Great Ambassadors in the Tema Colts League before joining division 1 club, Tema Real Sportive in 2003/4. The club gained promotion to the Ghanaian Premier League in 2004/5 and Esme was named as team captain. .After a total of four years with Real Sportive, Esme left the club and signed with the top clubAccra Hearts of Oak SC making them champions in 2008/2009 for the first time in 8 years. Also Hearts of Oak player of the year 2008/09. Esme was nominated in the Ghana Premier League All Star team 2007, 2008, 2009, 2010. Mends has attracted interest from a number of big Russian, Spanish, German and Italian teams in 2009 and 2010.

On 11 September 2013, Esme signed a one-year contract with Oman-based club Al-Oruba SC.

References

1986 births
Living people
Ghanaian Christians
Ghanaian footballers
Ghanaian expatriate footballers
Association football midfielders
Real Sportive players
Accra Hearts of Oak S.C. players
Al-Orouba SC players
Expatriate footballers in Oman
Ghanaian expatriate sportspeople in Oman